Bernd Lorenz (24 December 1947 – 6 April 2005) was a German footballer who played as a forward. During his career he played for TSV DUWO 08, Werder Bremen, Rapid Wien, Eintracht Frankfurt, BSC Young Boys, FC Augsburg, First Vienna FC and VfB Mödling.

Honours
Eintracht Frankfurt
DFB-Pokal: 1974–75

Rapid Wien
Austrian Cup: 1971–72

References

External links
 

1947 births
2005 deaths
German footballers
Association football forwards
SV Werder Bremen players
SK Rapid Wien players
Eintracht Frankfurt players
BSC Young Boys players
FC Augsburg players
First Vienna FC players
FC Admira Wacker Mödling players
Footballers from Hamburg
German expatriate footballers
German expatriate sportspeople in Switzerland
Expatriate footballers in Switzerland
German expatriate sportspeople in Austria
Expatriate footballers in Austria